Pain au chocolat (literally "chocolate bread"), also known as chocolatine in the south-west part of France and in Canada, or couque au chocolat in Belgium, is a type of Viennoiserie pastry consisting of a cuboid-shaped piece of yeast-leavened laminated dough, similar in texture to a puff pastry, with one or two pieces of dark chocolate in the center.

Pain au chocolat is made of the same layered doughs as a croissant. Often sold still hot or warm from the oven, they are commonly sold alongside croissants in French bakeries and supermarkets.

Name
In France, the name of the pain au chocolat varies by region:

In central France, in southern France and in Paris,  is used.
In southwestern France (Nouvelle-Aquitaine, Occitanie) and in Canada, the word  is used.

In Belgium, the words  are also used.

They are often sold in packages at supermarkets and convenience stores, or made fresh in pastry shops.

 In Morocco, Lebanon, Tunisia, Algeria, the Netherlands, Belgium, Norway, Ireland, Denmark, Sweden and the United Kingdom, they are sold in most bakeries, supermarkets and cafés.
 In the United States and sometimes in English Canada, they are commonly known as "chocolate croissants".
 In Mexico, they are also most commonly found in bakeries and supermarkets, and are known as chocolatines.
 In Australia and New Zealand, they are commonly referred to as "chocolate croissants", and are sold freshly baked in most bakeries and supermarkets.

Origins and history
Legend has it that Marie-Antoinette introduced the croissant to France, but croissants and chocolatines are a relatively modern invention. The word croissant, which refers to a pastry shaped like a half-moon or "crescent", made its entry in the French dictionary in 1863. The type of pastry, called viennoiserie in French, was introduced in the early 19th century, when August Zang, an Austrian officer, and Ernest Schwarzer, an Austrian aristocrat, founded a Viennese bakery in Paris located at 92, rue de Richelieu.

Originally, croissants and pains au chocolat were made from a brioche base but later evolved to incorporate a buttery flaky dough (pâte feuilletée).

See also

 List of desserts

References

Chocolate desserts
French pastries
Occitan desserts
Pastries
Cuisine of Quebec
Desserts
Belgian cuisine
Cuboids